Morton Denison Hull (January 13, 1867 – August 20, 1937) was a U.S. Representative from Illinois.

Born in Chicago, Illinois, Hull attended the public schools and Phillips Exeter Academy, Exeter, New Hampshire, in 1885. He graduated from Harvard University in 1892. He was admitted to the bar in 1892 and commenced the practice of law in Chicago. He was also financially interested in various manufacturing concerns. He served as a member of the Illinois House of Representatives from 1906 to 1914. He served as a member of the Illinois Senate from 1915 to 1922. He was an unsuccessful candidate for nomination for Governor in 1916. He served as a delegate to the Republican National Convention in 1916. He served as a trustee of the Meadville Theological Seminary and served on the Board of Trustees at Bennington College in Vermont. He served as a delegate to the state constitutional convention in 1920.

Hull was elected as a Republican to the Sixty-eighth Congress to fill the vacancy caused by the death of James R. Mann. He was re-elected to the Sixty-ninth and to the three succeeding Congresses and served from April 3, 1923, to March 3, 1933. He was not a candidate for renomination in 1932. He resumed his former pursuits. Greatly active in the First Unitarian Church of Chicago, he gave money for the construction of a new sanctuary in 1931, designed by his son. He died at his summer home in Bennington, Vermont at age 70. His remains were cremated and the ashes placed in a crypt in the First Unitarian Church in Chicago.

References

1867 births
1937 deaths
Phillips Exeter Academy alumni
Harvard University alumni
Republican Party Illinois state senators
Republican Party members of the Illinois House of Representatives
Politicians from Chicago
Republican Party members of the United States House of Representatives from Illinois
American Unitarians